Gajtan may refer to:

Gajtan, Albania, a village in Shkodër County, Albania
Gajtan cavern, natural monument of Albania
Donji Gajtan, in Serbia
Gornji Gajtan, in Serbia